Vasil Georgiev Binev (born October 13, 1957) is a Bulgarian actor. He is best known for his voice over roles in famous television series and films.

Acting career
In 1986, he graduated from NATFIZ with a degree in acting. From 1986 to 1988 he acted in the Drama Theater "Yordan Yovkov" in Dobrich. From 1988 to 1989 he acted in the Drama Theater "Adriana Budevska" in Burgas. Throughout the 1990s, he starred in plays on the stage of The Bulgarian Army Theater, however he is currently active mostly in voice overs.

In 2018, he played the businessman Ivo Fotev from the fifth and sixth season of Stolen Life in NOVA.

Voice acting career
The productions which he has dubbed into Bulgarian include Dharma and Greg, Farscape, CSI: Miami, Las Vegas, Lost, Desperate Housewives, Prison Break and The Big Bang Theory.

In 2010, he won the Icarus award in the category "Golden Voice" for his work on the TV series Yabanci Damat. He won after being nominated in 2006, 2007 and 2008.

Personal life
He is in a relationship with the actress Silvia Lulcheva. They have a daughter, Elitsa.

Roles

References

External links
 Vasil Binev in Art.bg

1957 births
Living people
Bulgarian male voice actors
Bulgarian male stage actors
Bulgarian male television actors
Male actors from Sofia
20th-century Bulgarian male actors
21st-century Bulgarian male actors